Justin Donta Brownlee (born April 23, 1988) is an American-born Filipino professional basketball player for the Barangay Ginebra San Miguel of the Philippine Basketball Association (PBA).

College career
Brownlee played college basketball at St. John's University from 2009 to 2011.

Professional career

Maine Red Claws
After Brownlee went undrafted in the 2011 NBA Draft, he began his professional basketball career with Maine Red Claws team of the NBA Development League.

New York Knicks
In the summer of 2012, Brownlee joined the New York Knicks for the 2012 NBA Summer League. He trained for the team during the 2013 Training Camp; but also played in the 2013 NBA Summer League. On September 30, 2013, he was signed a contract to the team prior to the start of the 2013–14 season, but was waived on October 2, 2013, becoming a free agent two days later on October 4, 2013.

Erie Bayhawks
On November 1, 2013, he was allocated by the Knicks to the Erie Bayhawks team of the NBA Development League, Brownlee averaged 13.85 points, 5.7 rebounds, 2.3 assists, 0.5 blocks and 1.4 steals throughout the regular season. Brownlee also received an NBA D-League Showcase Honorable Mention Team award on January 10, 2014. He was deactivated in the roster for 2 games on February 19, 2014, during their match against the Texas Legends but was activated again during their match against the Fort Wayne Mad Ants on February 28, 2014.

Barangay Ginebra San Miguel
In his first game with Ginebra, Brownlee recorded a double-double of 31 points and 13 rebounds but in a losing effort to the Alaska Aces.  
Brownlee helped Ginebra win the PBA Governors' Cup both in 2016, where he made the title clinching three-pointer at the buzzer in game 6 of the finals, and in 2017.
On May 21, 2018. Ginebra coach Tim Cone confirmed the move to replace Charles García with Brownlee after player agent Sheryl Reyes made the announcement on social media.

San Miguel Alab Pilipinas
Brownlee returned to the Philippines for the third time, this time playing for ASEAN Basketball League side San Miguel Alab Pilipinas, where he, along with Renaldo Balkman, would replace Reggie Okosa and Ivan Johnson as the team's imports. With the help of Brownlee and Balkman, the Philippine squad was hailed as the 2017–18 ABL season champion by beating Mono Vampire Basketball Club of Thailand in 3 out 5 games in the championship series.

Fourth Conference with the Barangay Ginebra San Miguel
After playing in the Asean Basketball League, Brownlee returned with the Barangay Ginebra San Miguel who were down 1–3 in the 2018 PBA Commissioner's Cup. Brownlee helped the Ginebra to secure the fifth seed for the upcoming playoffs. During the 2018 Commissioner Cup's playoffs, 
Brownlee averaged 27.4 points per Game, 12 rebounds per game, 6.6 assists per game and 2.2 blocks per game to lead Ginebra to a 3–1 record in the playoffs to enter the PBA Commissioner's Cup Finals.

In Game 1 of the 2018 PBA Commissioner's Cup Finals against the San Miguel Beermen, Brownlee led the Ginebra to a 1–0 series lead with 42 points, 7 rebounds, 9 assists and 2 blocks. He eventually won his first Best Import Award and helped the team capture the Commissioner's Cup title winning the series, 4–2.

Mighty Sports-Philippines
Brownlee was tapped to help lead the Mighty Sports-Philippines basketball team in the 30th Dubai International Basketball Tournament this February 1–9, 2019. He played alongside fellow imports, former NBA player Lamar Odom and Chinese Basketball Association veteran Randolph Morris to reinforce the team.

Al Riyadi
Before returning to Barangay Ginebra San Miguel for the 2019 PBA Commissioner's Cup, Brownlee signed with Al Riyadi of the Lebanese Basketball League. He joined the team mid-season.

Sixth and Seventh Conference with the Barangay Ginebra San Miguel
Ginebra taps Brownlee again for the 2019 PBA Commissioner's Cup. He debut for the Ginebra against the Blackwater Elite on May 24, 2019. He scored a game-high 44 points to go along with 10 rebounds and 7 assists but his team was defeated by the Elite in OT. The next game, Brownlee recorded 27 points, 12 rebounds, 8 assists and 4 blocks in a 110–95 victory over the Meralco Bolts. It was Ginebra's first win of the conference. On June 16, Brownlee scored a season-high 39 points to go along with 15 rebounds and 5 assists in a 110–107 win over the San Miguel Beermen. On July 7, in a game against the Magnolia Hotshots, Brownlee scored a professional career-high 49 points as he led the Barangay Ginebra in a win over the Hotshots. He also recorded 20 rebounds and 7 assists in the game. In the last game of the 2019 PBA Commissioners' Cup elimination, Justin Brownlee broke again his career-high with 50 points in a 127–123 overtime win over the Columbian Dyip.

During the 2019 Commissioners' Cup playoffs, Brownlee led Ginebra towards a series sweep against the Magnolia Hotshots after averaging 25 points per game and 12.5 rebounds per game while shooting 52.5 percent from the field in the series. In the semifinals round, Brownlee and the Ginebra San Miguel were up against the top-seeded TNT Katropa led by former NBA player Terrence Jones. They lose the series against TNT Katropa.

However, in the 2019 Governor's Cup, he led his team to another championship beating the Meralco Bolts in the Finals.

Al Sharjah
Brownlee suited up for Al Sharjah of the UAE National Basketball League.

Eighth Conference with Barangay Ginebra San Miguel
Brownlee suited up for Ginebra for the 2021 Governors' Cup. He recorded 38 points and 12 rebounds to extend the first-round series against the TNT Tropang Giga. Also, his 38 points elevated him to seventh place in the PBA All-time import scoring list, passing former import Larry McNeil. He led his team to their eighth semi-finals appearance in eight tries and later to fifth finals appearance with him on the roster. On April 13, 2022, he won his second Best Import Award and became the tenth import to win such award multiple times. On April 17, 2022, Brownlee became the first import to register 400 three pointers in PBA's history. On April 22, 2022, he surpassed Billy Ray Bates in the scoring list for imports and at that time, in fifth place with 4,539 points. As of April 2022, he is behind Norman Black with 11,329, Bobby Parks Sr. with 8,955, Sean Chambers with 8,225, and Lawrence Massey with 5,386. He is ahead of Bates with 4,523, Francois Wise with 4,332, McNeil with 4,169, Donny Ray Koonce with 4,103 and Billy Robinson with 4,024 points.

Ninth Conference with Barangay Ginebra San Miguel

Brownlee returned for the 2022–23 PBA Commissioner's Cup. On November 18, 2022, in a win against Blackwater, he recorded his 300th steal, the first PBA import to reach that milestone.

On December 18, 2022, win against Magnolia, he was the fifth import to reach 5,000 career points. On December 21, 2022, he led his team to a win against Magnolia. That win leads him to his sixth finals appearance. On January 6, 2023, he won his third Best Import Award.
On January 15, 2023, he won his sixth PBA championship against Bay Area Dragons in Game 7 PBA Finals. He tied Sean Chambers for most titles for a PBA import with 6, and remains undefeated in PBA Finals series. After that game, he recorded a career 5,268 points, 331 steals, and 476 3-point field goals made.

Tenth Conference with Barangay Ginebra San Miguel

On his first game on Februay 5, 2023 for the 2023 PBA Governors' Cup, he recorded a triple-double of 29 points, 11 rebounds and 10 assists in a win against Rain or Shine. On February 17, 2023, he surpassed Massey in the import scoring list for fourth all-time with 5,388 points.

On March 19, 2023, he led his team to a win against NLEX Road Warriors and to tenth semi-finals appearance with him on the roster.

National team career
Bronwlee has played for the Philippine national basketball team, debuting in the 2023 FIBA Basketball World Cup Asian qualifier game against Lebanon on February 24, 2023. He was made eligible to play for the Philippines as naturalized player under FIBA eligibility rules by being granted Filipino citizenship

In August 2018, Brownlee expressed his desire to stay in the Philippines and be a naturalized citizen. On August 15, 2018, a bill has been filed at the House of Representatives during the 18th Congress to grant Filipino citizenship to Brownlee. The bill did not became law, and was refiled in the 19th Congress. The proposed measure, House Bill 6224 was approved by the House of Representatives in November 2022. A counterpart bill in the Senate was likely passed the following month. President Bongbong Marcos signed the measure into law on January 12, 2023.

Personal life
Brownlee has a twin sister, two other sisters and a brother. He has also four children of his own.

Career statistics

|-
| align=center | 2011
| align=left | Toros de Nuevo Laredo 
| LNBP
| 10 || 26.9 || .500 || .300 || .739 || 6.0 || 1.8 || 1.2 || .5 || 13.6
|-
| align=center | 2011–12
| align=left | Maine Red Claws
| NBA D-League
| 50 || 23.5 || .447 || .296 || .796 || 4.9 || 1.4 || .8 || .5 || 8.0
|-
| align=center | 2013–14
| align=left | Erie Bayhawks
| NBA D-League
| 46 || 26.8 || .508 || .375 || .718 || 5.7 || 2.4 || 1.4 || .5 || 13.9
|-
| align=center | 2014–15
| align=left | Germani Basket Brescia
| Serie A2
| 35 || 31.1 || .498 || .394 || .674 || 7.9 || 1.9 || .9 || .7 || 16.3
|-
| align=center | 2015–16
| align=left | Élan Chalon
| LNB Pro A
| 36 || 21.2 || .476 || .272 || .817 || 5.5 || 1.4 || .7 || .4 || 9.3
|-
| align=center | 2015–16
| align=left | Élan Chalon
| Leaders Cup
| 3 || 14.7 || .538 || .333 || 1.000 || 1.0 || .0 || .0 || .0 || 6.0
|-
| align=center | 2015–16
| align=left | Élan Chalon
| EuroCup
| 19 || 20.7 || .522 || .442 || .838 || 4.0 || 1.8 || .4 || .1 || 8.8
|-
| align=center | 2018
| align=left | San Miguel Alab Pilipinas
| ABL
| 25 || 35.4 || .460 || .356 || .750 || 10.3 || 6.3 || 1.6 || 1.6 || 21.8
|-
| align=center | 2019
| align=left | Al Riyadi Beirut Club
| FBL League
| 15 || 27.9 || .533 || .370 || .844 || 4.8 || 2.0 || .9 || .7 || 16.1 
|-

PBA season-by-season averages

|-
| align=left | 
| align=left | Barangay Ginebra
| 22 || 40.5 || .504 || .360 || .663 || 11.3 || 3.8 || 1.7 || .9 || 28.6
|-
| align=left | 
| align=left | Barangay Ginebra
| 39 || 40.6 || .493 || .365 || .707 || 11.5 || 4.8 || 1.7 || 2.1 || 25.9
|-
| align=left | 
| align=left | Barangay Ginebra
| 35 || 41.8 || .516 || .358 || .819 || 12.3 || 6.7 || 1.9 || 1.7 || 30.4
|-
| align=left | 
| align=left | Barangay Ginebra
| 38 || 44.3 || .506 || .348 || .771 || 12.9 || 6.3 || 2.3 || 1.5 || 30.2 
|-
| align=left | 
| align=left | Barangay Ginebra
| 23 || 44.1 || .538 || .387 || .812 || 11.7 || 5.7 || 1.7 || 2.0 || 29.9 
|-class=sortbottom
| align="center" colspan="2" | Career
| 157 || 42.2 || .509 || .362 || .764 || 12.0 || 5.6 || 1.9 || 1.7 || 28.9

References

External links
 St. John's Profile
 Profile at realgm.com

1988 births
Living people
21st-century African-American sportspeople
African-American basketball players
Al Riyadi Club Beirut basketball players
American emigrants to the Philippines
American expatriate basketball people in France
American expatriate basketball people in Italy
American expatriate basketball people in Lebanon
American expatriate basketball people in Mexico
American expatriate basketball people in the United Arab Emirates
American men's basketball players
Barangay Ginebra San Miguel players
Basket Brescia Leonessa players
Basketball players from Georgia (U.S. state)
Chipola Indians men's basketball players
City College of San Francisco Rams men's basketball players
Élan Chalon players
Erie BayHawks (2008–2017) players
Filipino men's basketball players
Filipino people of African-American descent
Maine Red Claws players
Naturalized citizens of the Philippines
People from Tifton, Georgia
Philippine Basketball Association imports
Philippines men's national basketball team players
Power forwards (basketball)
San Miguel Alab Pilipinas players
Small forwards
St. John's Red Storm men's basketball players
Toros de Nuevo Laredo players
American twins
Twin sportspeople